On November 19–20, 2022, a mass shooting occurred at Club Q, an LGBTQ nightclub in Colorado Springs, Colorado, United States. Five people were killed, and 25 others were injured, 19 of them by gunfire. The accused, 22-year-old Anderson Lee Aldrich, was also injured and taken to a local hospital. Aldrich was charged and remanded in custody.

Background
Club Q is located at the 3430 block of North Academy Boulevard and opened in 2002. It was for a time the only LGBTQ club in Colorado Springs, Colorado's second-most populous city with a population of just under 500,000. A 2021 article by Denver-based magazine 5280 noted the club to be a place "where LGBTQ folks [went] for drag performances, dance parties, and drinks." The shooting occurred on the eve of the Transgender Day of Remembrance.

Since 2019, Colorado has had a red flag law that allows citizens or law enforcement to petition a court to order the removal of firearms from a potentially dangerous person.  Of the 19 states and the District of Columbia with red flag laws, Colorado has among the lowest per capita rates of invocation of the law. In opposition to the Colorado statute, more than half of the state's 64 counties declared themselves Second Amendment sanctuaries, including El Paso County where the shooting occurred. According to the Los Angeles Blade, "It is El Paso County Sheriff's Office's explicit policy not to petition for an Extreme Risk Protection Order (ERPO) or Temporary Risk Protection Order (TRPO) to remove firearms from at-risk people".

Shooting
According to the police chief, the shooting began when the shooter entered Club Q while a dance party was being held. Wielding an AR-15 style rifle, carrying multiple magazines of ammunition, and wearing body armor, the shooter immediately began firing at employees and patrons while moving further into the building. Many survivors at first mistook the gunfire for being a part of the music, until the shots continued and occupants saw the muzzle flashes. Multiple people sheltered behind the bar and in dressing rooms, while others stayed low to the ground.

Minutes into the shooting, a club patron, identified as U.S. Army veteran Richard M. Fierro, charged across the room and tackled the shooter to the ground, causing the rifle to fall out of reach. Fierro then grabbed a handgun from the shooter's hand and used it to hit the shooter repeatedly in the head. Fierro was assisted by two other patrons he recruited, including Thomas James, who moved the rifle away to safety, and a trans woman who used her high heels to stomp on the shooter, and who helped disable and hold the shooter down until the authorities arrived. Fierro estimated the shooter's weight at 300 pounds.

Police received an initial call for service regarding the shooting at 11:56 p.m. on November 19, with the first officer being dispatched a minute later. The first responding officer arrived in the area at 12:00 midnight and arrested a suspect two minutes later. A total of thirty-nine patrol officers from all four divisions of the Colorado Springs Police Department, along with thirty-four firefighters and eleven ambulances, responded to the scene. The suspect was in custody within about five minutes after the first 9-1-1 call. After the shooting stopped, many were at first reluctant to leave from hiding spots as they were unsure if the shooter was reloading or had been stopped. Fierro, who had been covered in blood, was placed in police custody in a squad car for over an hour before he was cleared of suspicion and released.

The injured were transported to three hospitals: seven to Penrose Hospital, ten to Memorial Hospital Central, and two to Memorial Hospital North. Some ambulances, with most of them AMR, had to transport up to three patients at a time, and a few police cruisers had to transport victims as well.

Victims 

Five people were killed, and twenty-five others were injured in the shooting, of whom nineteen were by gunfire. One of the deceased victims, Daniel Aston, was bar supervisor and a frequent performer at the nightclub. Another fatality, Raymond Vance, was the boyfriend of Fierro's daughter.

During the press conference, the chief of the Colorado Springs Police Department made a point to say the department respected all community members and that they would be identifying the deceased by the names they and their loved ones used. He then read the names of the deceased victims and included their pronouns.

Aftermath 
A vigil was held on November 20 with standing room only at the All Souls Unitarian Church, which was also attended by several members of the City Council. Additional memorials and events were held throughout the week, which promoted spaces for people to gather and donate. Donation drives were set up shortly after the shooting from both local organizations and GoFundMe fundraisers for the victims and their families.

On November 24, Colorado Springs evangelical ministry Focus on the Family was targeted with a graffiti message, reading: "Their blood is on your hands. Five lives taken."  The Focus on the Family organization actively advocates for people to "leave homosexuality" and follow Christ. According to The Independent, the conservative ministry "has lobbied against LGBT+ rights and characterised LGBT+ identities as 'a particularly evil lie of Satan'". The Human Rights Campaign has said that they "promote many dangerous ideas, practices and programs that cause real harm to LGBT+ people and their families", while the Southern Poverty Law Center considers the ministry to be a lobbying group that is central to the anti-gay movement of the religious right.

Accused
The accused was identified as Anderson Lee Aldrich, a 22-year-old resident of Colorado Springs. Aldrich was born Nicholas Franklin Brink on May 20, 2000, in San Diego, California, to Aaron Brink, a former pornographic film actor and mixed martial arts fighter, and Laura Voepel, the daughter of Randy Voepel, an outgoing member of the California State Assembly and a former mayor of Santee, California. Voepel and Brink separated and divorced one year after Aldrich's birth; while Voepel went on to receive custody over Aldrich, her tumultuous life – which included multiple arrests and mental health evaluations – resulted in Aldrich being cared for by Voepel's mother who eventually became Aldrich's legal guardian.

Aldrich grew up in northern San Antonio, Texas, and is a member of The Church of Jesus Christ of Latter-day Saints, though has not been involved in church services for at least a decade. Records indicate that Aldrich was a target of online bullying that involved homophobic taunts while in middle school. Aldrich changed names on April 28, 2016, shortly before turning 16, citing a desire to remove associations with Aaron Brink, who by that point had multiple criminal convictions.

Aldrich's attorneys have said in court documents that their client identifies as non-binary and uses they/them pronouns, preferring to be addressed as Mx. Aldrich. Neighbors allege Aldrich to have made hateful comments towards the LGBTQ community in the past, including frequent usage of homophobic slurs. Aldrich never mentioned being non-binary prior to the shooting and was referred to with masculine pronouns by the family members. Police testified they found rainbow-colored shooting targets in Aldrich's home. Experts in online extremism have voiced the possibility that Aldrich's proclaimed self-identification could be disingenuous; while the Center for Countering Digital Hate has advised using they/them pronouns for Aldrich, and to balance this with an acknowledgement of the suspect's past actions and impact on the LGBTQ community.

Prior incidents
On June 18, 2021, Aldrich's maternal grandparents revealed their plans to shift to Florida. Angered at the development, Aldrich complained about losing access to the material stored in the basement which was intended for "conduct[ing] a mass shooting and bombing". Aldrich held the grandparents hostage, and threatened to murder them. Eventually, Aldrich let them go, shifted to Voepel's house, and holed up there. During an hour-long standoff with Colorado SWAT, an armed Aldrich live-streamed from inside and threatened to blow up the house. Neighboring homes had to be evacuated. Upon surrendering, a tub filled with explosive grade material — including ammonium nitrate and tannerite — was recovered alongside handguns, ballistic vests, and gas masks; Aldrich was jailed and charged with multiple counts of kidnapping and felony menacing. Aldrich entered into a not guilty plea and was released on bail, a fortnight later. The case made negligible progress with Voepel and the grandparents refusing to accept any subpoena, under technical grounds, to avoid testifying against Aldrich. In July 2022, the case was dismissed, and records were sealed a month later.

Twice before the 2021 incident Aldrich had been reported to Colorado Police for "escalating homicidal behavior." On June 17, 2021, Aldrich's grand-aunt contacted the Federal Bureau of Investigation to report Aldrich was planning to kill Christians and government employees, after Aldrich's grandfather had reported being threatened by Aldrich; however, the family did not press charges with local police. There is no record that law enforcement authorities or Aldrich's relatives attempted to trigger the Colorado red flag law, which might have allowed for the seizure of any weapons and ammunition that Aldrich possessed.

Aldrich and Laura Voepel had conflicts with passengers and crew during a July 2022 flight from California to Colorado. They were accused of harassing others while aboard the plane, and insulting some with racial slurs. After deplaning, Aldrich was filmed saying to another passenger: "I wish I can shoot all of you" and "You keep following me and I'm going to fuck you up."

Social media activity 
Aldrich had allegedly created a "free speech" website that hosted violent and racist content — including a video that advocated for killing civilians to "cleanse society" — as of the night of the shooting. A second site that was identified as a "brother website" on its homepage, had hosted footage of the 2022 Buffalo shooting and, on the night of the Club Q shooting, came to display four other videos, including one which apparently showed Aldrich's face reflected in a vehicle's rear view mirror. Testimony from a February 2023 hearing implied that Aldrich had operated a neo-Nazi website prior to the shooting.

Legal proceedings 
After the shooting, Aldrich was charged with ten felony counts: five counts of murder, and five counts of committing a bias-motivated crime causing bodily injury. An El Paso County judge authorized the sealing of Aldrich's prior arrest records, saying the public release of the documents could "jeopardize the ongoing investigation." Aldrich appeared via video from the El Paso County jail on November 23 for a hearing in which Aldrich was advised of the arrest charges and of bond conditions, although Aldrich is being held without bond. Aldrich is currently being represented by a public defender.

On December 6, Aldrich was charged with 305 criminal counts, which included first-degree murder, attempted first-degree murder, assault of the first and second degree, and hate crimes. District Attorney Michael Allen said it was "probably the most charges that we’ve ever filed in a single case, on a murder case like this in the state of Colorado". A preliminary hearing was scheduled for February 22, 2023. Lawyers for the prosecution and defense asked for the hearing to be rescheduled to May. On December 8, a judge ordered the unsealing of court documents pertaining to Aldrich's June 2021 arrest.

On January 13, 2023, Aldrich was charged with new felony offenses for attempted murder and hate crimes. The additional twelve charges raised the total number of criminal counts to 317.

On February 22, a hearing regarding the case took place.

Responses
The shooting was condemned by certain politicians in the immediate aftermath. President Joe Biden said, "While no motive in this attack is yet clear, we know that the LGBTQI+ community has been subjected to horrific hate violence in recent years." Transportation Secretary Pete Buttigieg said that anti-LGBT political discourse is partially to blame for the shooting. The El Paso County government said "We are deeply saddened by the senseless shooting that occurred early this morning in Colorado Springs at Club Q" and sent condolences to support victim's families.

Colorado's red flag law and its application were scrutinized by advocates of gun violence prevention, politicians, and others. Governor Jared Polis, the nation's first openly gay governor, said "We are eternally grateful for the brave individuals who blocked the [shooter] likely saving lives in the process" and called for an examination of the application of Colorado's red flag law by Colorado's sheriffs. Colorado Springs Mayor John Suthers said law enforcement should take advantage of the law under appropriate circumstances, while cautioning against jumping to conclusions about the application of the law to this shooting. Colorado state representative Tom Sullivan, whose son was killed in the 2012 Aurora, Colorado shooting and sponsor of the state's red flag law said the prior incident should have alerted the community. Jeffrey Swanson, a professor at Duke University School of Medicine who studies red flag laws, said Colorado's law could have been invoked.

LGBTQ groups have widely memorialized the victims, and linked the mass shooting to recent rhetoric. Club Q said on social media that it was "devastated by the senseless attack on our community" and that it offered condolences to the victims and their families. The co-owners of Club Q attributed the shooting to a different kind of anti-LGBTQ hatred, inflamed by some Republican politicians and right-wing influencers and rooted in the demonization of drag queens as "groomers". Democrats have also been criticized by some for historically not doing enough to counteract anti-trans narratives, and generally being reluctant to proactively defend the transgender community.

The Church of Jesus Christ of Latter-day Saints released a statement condemning the shooting. The statement read, in part, "The senseless act of violence in Colorado Springs is of great sadness and concern to us. We are greatly troubled by any violence in our communities and condemn most especially violent acts that are the result of intolerance ..."

In their responses to the shooting, several far-right pundits have promoted an LGBT grooming conspiracy theory, as well as perpetuating moral panic. Conservative media personality Tucker Carlson displayed a banner on his Fox News program Tucker Carlson Tonight that read "Stop Sexualizing Kids" while later hosting a guest who said that mass shootings would keep happening "until we end this evil agenda that is attacking children". YouTube commentator Tim Pool responded by criticizing the venue's drag show performances, saying, "We shouldn't tolerate pedophiles grooming kids. Club Q had a grooming event"; while right-wing commentators Matt Walsh, Candace Owens, Chaya Raichik, and Representative Marjorie Taylor Greene all continued to publish content targeting LGBTQ people, some of which focused specifically on the Colorado area.

After issuing a statement in which she offered her prayers to those affected by the shooting and called for the lawless violence to end, Representative Lauren Boebert (R-CO) was accused of hypocrisy based on her history of anti-LGBTQ rhetoric. Her past comments have included false grooming narratives and the litter boxes in schools hoax. She has been criticized for blocking gun control laws.

Jenna Ellis, a former lawyer for Donald Trump, was criticized for saying that the five people killed during the shooting were "now reaping the consequences of ... eternal damnation" because she claimed that there was "no evidence" the victims were Christian.

Far-right provocateurs, including Jack Posobiec, questioned Richard Fierro's presence at the drag show, while others on the far-right called Fierro a "groomer" and a "faggot" simply because he and his family were at Club Q. Analysis published by the Institute for Strategic Dialogue has estimated that online usage of the terms 'pedophile' and 'groomer' increased sharply in the days following the shooting, as part of far-right and neo-Nazi celebration of, and apologia for, the massacre. The Department of Homeland Security also reported in a bulletin published on 30 November that online extremists praised the actions of the shooter. A significant rise in homophobic and transphobic posts following the shooting has been tracked by LGBT advocates both in far-right forums such as Gab and in more mainstream social media such as Twitter, Facebook, and YouTube.

On December 14, 2022, several survivors of the mass shooting presented their testimony to the United States House Committee on Oversight and Reform. The witnesses placed blame for the attack on hateful rhetoric, calling it the direct cause of the massacre, and also warned of the dangers of hate speech, saying that it is damaging even in the absence of explicit calls for violence. At the hearing, Club Q owner Matthew Haynes pushed back at Republican politicians, saying "I know that we, our Club Q community, are in the thoughts and prayers of so many of you. Unfortunately these thoughts and prayers alone are not saving lives. They're not changing the rhetoric of hate." Haynes also read aloud examples from some of the hundreds of the hateful messages received following the shooting, including one that said "the shooter was doing God's work". Survivor James Slaugh said that LGBTQ issues should not be politicized, and urged respect for basic human rights: "Outside of these spaces, we are continually being dehumanized, marginalized and targeted. The fear-based and hateful rhetoric surrounding the LGBTQ+ community, especially around trans individuals and drag performers, leads to violence."

See also

2022 Bratislava shooting
2022 Oslo shooting
List of mass shootings in the United States in 2022
List of shootings in Colorado
Orlando nightclub shooting
Tel Aviv gay centre shooting
Violence against LGBT people

References

2022 active shooter incidents in the United States
2022 in Colorado
2022 in LGBT history
2022 mass shootings in the United States
2020s crimes in Colorado
Nightclub shooting
Anti-drag sentiment
Anti-LGBT sentiment
Attacks on bars
Attacks on buildings and structures in 2022
Attacks on buildings and structures in Colorado
Attacks on nightclubs
Deaths by firearm in Colorado
LGBT in Colorado
LGBT-related controversies in the United States
Mass shootings in Colorado
Mass shootings in the United States
November 2022 crimes in the United States
Transgender history in the United States
Violence against LGBT people in the United States
Violence against gay men in the United States
Violence against trans men
Violence against trans women